Giuseppe Devastato (born in Napoli) is an Italian pianist and composer.

Life
Italian pianist and composer Giuseppe Devastato was born in Napoli, Italy. He recorded many movie soundtracks for the film industry, for television and radio stations in Europe and America. Including soundtracks for Warner Chappell Music, CAM and Rai 5. On December 9, 2011 he was awarded the "International Prize Cartagine" to human merit and professional achievements in the "MUSIC" section, for the dissemination of music in general - and Italian music in particular - around the world, in virtue of the merits acquired as a pianist and composer, with the intention to spread the world of classical music: "His actions show high sensitivity and a deep love for life. His playing is intended to imitate the human voice and is inspired by the art of Bel Canto of the Neapolitan School". Currently he lives in Madrid, Spain, is Piano Profesor at Musical Arts Madrid and Accademia Musicale Europea".

External links
Official website
Interview with Italian pianist and composer Giuseppe Devastato 
ECMTA Pianist Giuseppe Devastato in China
City of Prague: concert of Giuseppe Devastato in Prague 

Living people
Musicians from Naples
Italian composers
Italian male composers
Year of birth missing (living people)
Male pianists
21st-century pianists
21st-century Italian male musicians